Conrad Charles Daellenbach C.M. (born July 12, 1945) is an American and Canadian tubist. He is best known as one of the founding members of the Canadian Brass, in which he remains the quintet's tuba player, publisher, business administrator and professional relationships manager. Daellenbach is the most recorded tuba performer in history.

Early life and personal life
Conrad Charles Daellenbach was born to a musical family in Rhinelander, Wisconsin, on July 12, 1945.  Descended from four generations of Swiss and German musicians, he followed his two older sisters into the choirs, bands and orchestras taught by his father. As a young player, Daellenbach met and studied with the legendary artist/teacher Arnold Jacobs, followed by early entry to the Eastman School of Music while still in high school, eventually graduating with a Bachelor of Music in 1966, a Master of Arts in 1968 and a Ph.D. in 1971. Daellenbach first met Arnold Jacobs at the Gunnison, Colorado Music Festival in 1962, a relationship that lasted throughout Jacobs' lifetime.

Career

Daellenbach moved to Toronto and taught music at the Faculty of Music at the University of Toronto. The Canadian Brass was formed in 1970 by Daellenbach and trombonist Gene Watts, enlisting trumpeter Stuart Laughton and University of Toronto Business School graduate Graeme Page.  At this point, Daellenbach has performed fifty years with a seven-thousand performance streak in the ensemble, often compared to the famous baseball hall-of-famer Cal Ripken Jr. who played 2632 consecutive games.

Daellenbach's contributions to the brass world include over 600 standard repertoire works for brass quintets, more than 30 best-selling concert band versions of the most popular Canadian Brass repertoire, and an educational series that has sold nearly one million copies worldwide.  His recording company, Opening Day Entertainment (ODEG), has produced over 73 CDs and DVDs.  Three ODEG CDs have been top-10 Billboard hits, four have received Juno Awards, and 13 have been Juno nominated.

Ten most defining events for Daellenbach within the Canadian Brass are:
1. Ten appearances on Sesame Street
2. Ambassadors to China in 1977 sent by Prime Minister Pierre Elliot Trudeau
3. First chamber ensemble to play the MAINSTAGE at Carnegie Hall in NYC
4. Successful appearance on the Johnny Carson Tonight Show
5. Feature artist on Hunan TV's New Year's Show viewed by over half a billion viewers 2012
6. Nominated for 17 Junos (Canadian Grammy), winner of the German Echo Award (German Grammy) and several Grammy nominations
7. Voted "Audience Favourite Tuba Player" by Brass Bulletin
8. Schweizerhof Hotel in Lucerne Switzerland designates Room 182 as the "Daellenbach Room"
9. Daellenbach invited to the Board of Euterpe Music (Toronto), honorary board memory of The Coalition for Music Education (Canada) and former board member Music Educators National Conference (USA)
10. Eastman School of Music named Dr. Daellenbach "Distinguished Alumnus.”

In 2014, he was made a Member of the Order of Canada "for popularizing classical music, notably as a founder of the Canadian Brass, one of our nation's most internationally renowned classical music groups".

As of 2022, Daellenbach still plays in the Canadian Brass and, with the retirement of Gene Watts in 2010, is the last original member touring with the group.

Personal life
Daellenbach is married with two sons. The family resides in Toronto.

References

External links
 Profile at Canadian Brass's official website

1945 births
20th-century American musicians
21st-century American musicians
20th-century Canadian male musicians
21st-century Canadian male musicians
Living people
American classical tubists
American expatriates in Canada
American music educators
American people of Swiss-German descent
Canadian classical tubists
Canadian music educators
Canadian people of Swiss-German descent
Eastman School of Music alumni
Members of the Order of Canada
Musicians from Wisconsin
People from Rhinelander, Wisconsin
Academic staff of the University of Toronto
Classical musicians from Wisconsin
21st-century tubists